WMO English Academy, Karunyapuram under Wayanad Muslim Orphanage is an educational institution located in Muttil village at Wayanad district Headquarters Kalpetta.It was the First Center Board of Secondary Education-Certified English school in Wayanad.

This school is a member of Wayanad Sahodaya Schools Complex.

Infrastructure
Digital Class Rooms
Seminar Hall
Library
Computer Lab
Physics Lab
Chemistry Lab
Play Ground
Public Address System
Transport Facilities
Residential Facilities for Girls & Boys
Children's Park
Medical Care

The school has an equipped first aid system. Each student undergoes medical examinations once in a year conducted.

Guidance and Counseling

The school provide counseling and guidance under the care of expert counselors and psychologists, Parent Effective Training (PET),  Career Guidance Programs, Motivation Classes, Life Enrichment Programs as well as residential camps for the multi-dimensional growth of the students.

Boarding Facility

Separate hostel for boys and girls are available on first-come, first-served basis at the WMO hostels. Both boys and girls hostels will have their own male and female wardens respectively.

References

Private schools in Kerala
Schools in Wayanad district